E Jie (born 24 June 1967) is a Chinese fencer. She competed in the women's individual and team foil events at the 1992 Summer Olympics.

References

1967 births
Living people
Chinese female foil fencers
Olympic fencers of China
Fencers at the 1992 Summer Olympics
Asian Games medalists in fencing
Fencers at the 1990 Asian Games
Asian Games gold medalists for China
Asian Games bronze medalists for China
Medalists at the 1990 Asian Games